The following is an episode list for the E! series, Kendra.

Series overview

Episodes

Season 1 (2009)

Season 2 (2009–10)

Season 3 (2010–11)

Season 4 (2011)

References

General references

External links
 

Lists of American non-fiction television series episodes

es:Anexo:Episodios de Kendra